Dušan "Duda" Ivković (29 October 1943 – 16 September 2021) was a Serbian professional basketball player and coach. He served as head coach of the senior Serbian national basketball team from 2007 to 2013, and of the senior Yugoslavian national basketball team, from 1987 (Serbia and Montenegro competed as the FR Yugoslavia national team following the breakup of Yugoslavia) to 1995. He was also the president of the Serbian club BKK Radnički.

In 2008, he was named one of the 50 Greatest EuroLeague Contributors. He was elected to the FIBA Hall of Fame in 2017. He was also named a EuroLeague Basketball Legend in 2017.

Playing career
A point guard, Ivković played 10 seasons in Yugoslavia from 1958 to 1968 and spent his entire playing career with Radnički Belgrade. He retired as a player in 1968 joining their youth system as a head coach.

Club coaching career
After retirement in 1968, Ivković joined a youth system of Radnički Belgrade as their junior head coach. In the third season, 1973–74, he led the junior team to the Yugoslav Championship title. In 1977, he became an assistant coach for Partizan under Ranko Žeravica. In 1978, he got promoted as the Partizan's head coach which he led for two years and won the first trophies in his career. In the 1978–79 season, he won the triple crown with Partizan (Yugoslav Championship, Yugoslav Cup, as well as the FIBA Korać Cup). Prior to that Partizan had won only one major trophy (one Yugoslav Championship) and it was a birth-year of what eventually will become the most successful club in Serbian history.

In 1980, Ivković left Partizan to join Greek side Aris, where he also stayed for two seasons. Then he return to Radnički Belgrade where he spent his entire playing career, and then a three-year stint in Šibenka and two more seasons in Vojvodina. Ivković returned to Greece in 1990 when he took over P.A.O.K., to which he brought the second and last title of Greek Championship in the club's history (1992). After three years on the black-and-white bench, he moved to Athens-based Panionios, and in 1996, the peak of his club career followed when he sat on the bench of Olympiacos. In the 1996–97 season, he brought the Red-Whites to the first title of the FIBA EuroLeague. In the same season he won a Greek Championship, also.

After three years in Olympiacos, Ivković took over the city rival AEK and brought them the 2000 FIBA Saporta Cup. Ivković moved from Greece to Russia in the summer of 2002, when he came to CSKA Moscow, a club with a great tradition. He took over the coaching job and the club's basketball operations at the same time. In the next three years, the club reached the EuroLeague Final Four three times, won all three Russian Championships and one Russian Cup. From there, he moved to Moscow's second largest club in 2005, Dynamo Moscow for two more where he won the 2006 ULEB Cup. In the summer of 2007, Ivković decided to take a break from his club career and was without a club for three years, only to return to Olympiacos in 2010, winning the Greek Cup in 2011 and also won the 2012 Euroleague, with his team trailing CSKA Moscow by 19 points in the third quarter and winning with a buzzer beater by Georgios Printezis in the last seconds of the final. He also won Greek Championship with Olympiacos a few weeks later, before leaving the team after his contract expired in the end of the season.

In 2014, Ivković signed a two-year contract with the Turkish team Anadolu Efes, starting to coach from the 2014–15 season. On 1 July 2016, Ivković officially retired from professional coaching.

National team coaching

Assisting Luka Stančić with Yugoslavia junior (under-18) and cadet (under-16) teams 
Success with the Radnički Belgrade youth team recommended Ivković for the Yugoslav junior national team coaching staff, so, for the 1976 European Championship for Juniors in Santiago de Compostela, 32-year-old coach Ivković was named assistant to the more experienced head coach Luka Stančić. The Yugoslav Juniors led by Aco Petrović, Miško Marić, and Predrag Bogosavljev won gold by beating the Soviet Union 92–83 in the final. 

After the 1976 success, Ivković continued his assistant job under head coach Stančić within the Yugoslav national team youth system; in addition to assisting Stančić in the junior (under-18) national team, Ivković also assisted him in the cadet (under-16) national team. He would stay at the job until 1980, winning three medals at the European Championships in the process: two silvers at the 1977 Championship for Cadets and the 1980 Championship for Juniors, as well as a bronze at the 1978 Championship for Juniors. Interestingly, Ivković kept doing the youth national teams assistant job even after being named to the high profile position of KK Partizan's head coach in 1978 and winning the "Small Triple Crown" with the club in 1979.

Yugoslavia university team head coach and assisting Krešo Ćosić with Yugoslavia national team
In summer 1983, with a bit of a head coaching resume under his belt already featuring appointments at KK Partizan and Aris B.C., Radnički Belgrade head coach Ivković was simultaneously named head coach of the Yugoslavia university team with the upcoming Universiade in Edmonton his first order of business. With a roster featuring supremely talented 18-year-old Šibenka player Dražen Petrović, the team got silver after losing to Canada in the final.

At the 1986 FIBA World Championship in Spain, Ivković was an assistant coach for the Yugoslavia national team under head coach Krešimir Ćosić. Featuring the still 21-year-old established and dominant European player Dražen Petrović, who had just led his club side Cibona to the second straight Euroleague title, the Yugoslavia team disappointingly only got bronze after losing to Soviet Union in the semifinal despite being up by 9 points with 53 seconds left in the game.

Ivković also assisted Ćosić the following summer at EuroBasket 1987 where Yugoslavia again, somewhat disappointingly, got bronze.

Barely three weeks after assisting Ćosić at EuroBasket 1987, Ivković was again the head coach of the Yugoslavia university team, this time at the Universiade at home in Zagreb. The team, featuring now 22-year-old European superstar Petrović, won gold in dominant fashion.

Head coach
Also in 1987, Ivković succeeded Ćosić as head coach of the senior Yugoslavian national basketball team, and held the post until the breakup of Yugoslavia, in 1991.

Ivković then assumed the head coaching position of the senior FR Yugoslavia. He guided the team to a gold medal at EuroBasket 1995, in the country's first official appearance since the UN lifted sanctions against FR Yugoslavia. Following EuroBasket, Željko Obradović took over as head coach, while Ivković assumed the role of team manager. Both Obradović and Ivković remained in their posts until jointly resigning in November 2000, following a sixth-place finish in the 2000 Summer Olympics.

Ivković became head coach of Serbia in early 2008. In April 2011, he agreed to work pro bono for the remainder of his contract.

Personal life
Ivković's elder brother Slobodan "Piva" Ivković was also a famous basketball player and coach. Ivković had earned a degree from the University of Belgrade Mining and Geology Faculty. Ivković was related to the famous Serbian-American scientist Nikola Tesla. Ivković's maternal grandmother, Olga Mandić, and Tesla were first cousins. Coincidentally, Tesla died the same year that Ivković was born.

Ivković was a record-holding pigeon racer.

Ivković died on 16 September 2021 in Belgrade due to a pulmonary edema and herpes. He was buried at the Belgrade New Cemetery on 21 September. 
The funeral service was attended by numerous active and retired basketball players and coaches, including Vlade Divac, Dragan Kićanović, Vassilis Spanoulis, Dimitrios Itoudis, Žarko Paspalj, Željko Obradović, Predrag Danilović, Dino Rađa, Jure Zdovc, and others.

Career achievements
Source

Club competitions
As head coach:
 EuroLeague champion: 2 (with Olympiacos: 1996–97, 2011–12)
 FIBA Saporta Cup winner: 1 (with AEK: 1999–00)
 FIBA Korać Cup winner: 1 (with Partizan: 1978–79)
 ULEB Cup winner: 1 (with Dynamo Moscow: 2005–06)
 Greek League champion: 3 (with PAOK: 1991–92; with Olympiacos: 1996–97, 2011–12)
 Russian League champion: 3 (with CSKA Moscow: 2002–03, 2003–04, 2004–05)
 Yugoslav League champion: 1 (with Partizan: 1978–79)
 Yugoslav Cup winner: 1 (with Partizan: 1978–79)
 Greek Cup winner: 4 (with Olympiacos: 1996–97, 2010–11; with AEK: 1999–00, 2000–01)
 Russian Cup winner: 1 (with CSKA Moscow: 2004–05)
 Turkish Cup winner: 1 (with Anadolu Efes: 2014–15)
 Turkish President's Cup winner: 1 (with Anadolu Efes: 2015–16)
 Triple Crown winner: 2 (with Olympiacos: 1996–97; with Partizan: 1978–79)

National team competitions
As head coach:
 1983 Summer Universiade: 
 1987 Summer Universiade: 
 1988 Summer Olympics: 
 EuroBasket 1989: 
 1990 FIBA World Championship: 
 EuroBasket 1991: 
 EuroBasket 1995: 
 EuroBasket 2009: 

As an assistant coach:
 1976 FIBA Europe Under-18 Championship: 
 1977 FIBA Europe Under-16 Championship: 
 1978 FIBA Europe Under-18 Championship: 
 1980 FIBA Europe Under-18 Championship: 
 1986 FIBA World Championship: 
 EuroBasket 1987: 
 1996 Summer Olympics: 
 EuroBasket 1997: 
 1998 FIBA World Championship:

See also
 FIBA Basketball World Cup winning head coaches
 List of EuroCup-winning head coaches
 List of EuroLeague-winning head coaches
 List of FIBA EuroBasket winning head coaches

References

External links

 Dušan Ivković at euroleague.net
 The top of the Greek bench: Dušan Ivković at esake.gr 

1943 births
2021 deaths
Anadolu Efes S.K. coaches
AEK B.C. coaches
Aris B.C. coaches
Basketball players from Belgrade
BC Dynamo Moscow coaches
BKK Radnički coaches
BKK Radnički players
Burials at Belgrade New Cemetery
KK Šibenik coaches
Respiratory disease deaths in Serbia
EuroLeague-winning coaches
FIBA EuroBasket-winning coaches
FIBA Hall of Fame inductees
KK Partizan coaches
KK Vojvodina coaches
Medalists at the 1988 Summer Olympics
Olympiacos B.C. coaches
Olympic silver medalists for Yugoslavia
Panionios B.C. coaches
P.A.O.K. BC coaches
PBC CSKA Moscow coaches
People from Belgrade
Point guards
Serbia and Montenegro national basketball team coaches
Serbia national basketball team coaches
Serbian expatriate basketball people in Croatia
Serbian expatriate basketball people in Greece
Serbian expatriate basketball people in Russia
Serbian expatriate basketball people in Turkey
Serbian men's basketball coaches
Serbian men's basketball players
University of Belgrade alumni
Yugoslav basketball coaches
Yugoslav men's basketball players